Iñigo Pérez Soto (born 18 January 1988) is a Spanish former professional footballer who played as a central midfielder, currently assistant manager of Rayo Vallecano.

Club career
A product of Athletic Bilbao's youth ranks at Lezama, Pérez was born in Pamplona, Navarre, and moved to the reserves in early 2007 although he still spent some more time with CD Basconia, the farm team. On 28 October 2009, he made his debut for the main squad, starting in a 2–0 Copa del Rey defeat at Rayo Vallecano (4–2 aggregate loss). He first appeared in La Liga two days later, replacing veteran Pablo Orbaiz in a 1–0 home win against Atlético Madrid.

Definitely promoted to Athletic's first team for the 2010–11 season, Pérez scored in his first official appearance, a 3–0 home victory over RCD Mallorca, playing the last ten minutes in the place of Iker Muniain. On 8 March 2011 he was loaned to SD Huesca of the Segunda División – the winter transfer window had long since closed, but the Royal Spanish Football Federation allowed the move as the Aragonese had just lost David Bauzá to an anterior cruciate ligament injury.

Pérez appeared much more regularly for the Basques in the 2011–12 campaign under new manager Marcelo Bielsa, playing 40 games in all competitions mainly due to the departure of Orbaiz (loaned to Olympiacos FC) and the serious knee injury of Carlos Gurpegui. He spent the first half of 2013–14 on loan at Mallorca, returning on 31 January 2014 due to stress problems.

On 18 July 2014, Pérez joined second division club CD Numancia after terminating his contract with Athletic. On 2 July 2018, he agreed to a four-year deal with CA Osasuna of the same league, for a €750,000 fee.

Pérez retired at the end of 2021–22 at the age of 34, having made 85 official appearances during his spell at the El Sadar Stadium. Subsequently, he joined the coaching staff of his former Athletic temmate Andoni Iraola at Rayo Vallecano.

Career statistics

Honours
Athletic Bilbao
Copa del Rey runner-up: 2011–12
UEFA Europa League runner-up: 2011–12

Osasuna
Segunda División: 2018–19

References

External links

1988 births
Living people
Spanish footballers
Footballers from Pamplona
Association football midfielders
La Liga players
Segunda División players
Segunda División B players
Tercera División players
CD Basconia footballers
Bilbao Athletic footballers
Athletic Bilbao footballers
SD Huesca footballers
RCD Mallorca players
CD Numancia players
CA Osasuna players